Intercession Cathedral, Kharkiv (1689)
 Assumption Cathedral, Kharkiv (1777)
 Annunciation Cathedral, Kharkiv (1901)